"The Hearse Song" is a song about burial and human decomposition, of unknown origin. It was popular as a World War I song, and was popular in the 20th century as an American and British children's song, continuing to the present. It has many variant titles, lyrics, and melodies, but generally features the line "The worms crawl in, the worms crawl out," and thus is also known as "The Worms Crawl In." Generally, the song recounts the viewing of a hearse, prompting the thought of death. The listener's body is buried in a casket and assaulted by worms, then decomposes; some versions continue by stating the dead listener will be forced to eat their moldering remains.

History 
The earliest version of the verse is found in a poem by the English writer Matthew Lewis, incorporated in his popular 1796 Gothic novel The Monk, which includes the lines, "The worms they crept in, and the worms they crept out and sported his eyes and his temples about." While there are reports of the song dating back to British soldiers in the Crimean War (1853–1856), it certainly dates to at least World War I (1914–1918), when it was sung by American and British soldiers, and was collected in various World War I songbooks of the 1920s. 

The key line, "The worms crawl in, the worms crawl out" appears in some versions of the otherwise unrelated song, There Was a Lady All Skin and Bone, and may date to 1810 or earlier.

References

Sources

 
 
 
 

English children's songs
Songs about death
Songs about invertebrates
Songs of World War I
Traditional children's songs
The Pogues songs
Year of song unknown
Hearses